David John Mowat (born 20 February 1957) is a former Conservative Party politician in the United Kingdom. He was the Member of Parliament (MP) for Warrington South, and was first elected at the 2010 general election. He was appointed as Parliamentary Under-Secretary of State for Care and Support at the Department of Health in July 2016. He lost the seat to Labour at the 2017 election.

Early life 
Mowat attended Lawrence Sheriff School and at one point was in the same class as Rugby MP Mark Pawsey. He then went on to study engineering at Imperial College London.

Career before Parliament
After graduating, Mowat qualified as a Chartered Accountant and subsequently joined the consultancy firm Accenture where he eventually became a Global Managing Partner responsible for a business with a turnover of over £500m.

Prior to his election to Parliament, Mowat served as the Chairman of Fairbridge, a charitable organisation in Salford which helps to improve the life chances of disadvantaged young people. Mowat also served as a Councillor on Macclesfield Borough Council from 2007 to 2008.

Parliamentary career
Mowat served as a member of the Scottish Affairs Select Committee from 2010 to 2012 and also served on the Joint Committee scrutinising the draft Financial Services Bill. He was a trustee of the House of Commons Pension Fund and served on the Board of the Parliamentary Office for Science & Technology, the non-partisan advisory body on Science & Technology policy within Parliament.

He was also a member of several All Party Parliamentary Groups including Autism, Financial Education for Young People, Chess, Nuclear and Rail in the North. He was vice-chairman President of the Rugby League and Nuclear Power Groups. He was also co-chair of the All-Party Group on Rebalancing the British Economy and became Chair of the UK Aluminium Industry APPG in 2013.

On 10 September 2012 Mowat was appointed as Parliamentary Private Secretary to the then Financial Secretary to the Treasury, Greg Clark and followed Clark to the Cabinet Office following a reshuffle in 2014. Mowat stepped down from the role in 2015.

Mowat was opposed to Brexit prior to the 2016 referendum.

Following the appointment of Theresa May as Prime Minister in July 2016, Mowat was appointed to the Department of Health as the Parliamentary Under-Secretary of State for Care and Support.

Election to Parliament
Mowat was elected to Parliament for the Warrington South Constituency on 6 May 2010 during the 2010 General Election with a majority of 1,553 over the Labour candidate after incumbent Labour MP Helen Southworth decided to step down. He was re-elected in 2015 with an increased majority after adding 6,287 votes compared to 2010 – the highest such increase in any seat apart from Thirsk & Malton. He failed to get elected for a third time in the 2017 United Kingdom general election, losing out to Labour's Faisal Rashid.

References

External links 
 David Mowat MP official constituency website
 David Mowat MP Conservative Party profile
 Warrington South Conservatives
 

1957 births
Living people
Accenture people
Alumni of Imperial College London
Conservative Party (UK) MPs for English constituencies
UK MPs 2010–2015
UK MPs 2015–2017
Conservative Party (UK) councillors
Councillors in Cheshire